Sir Samuel Cornish, 1st Baronet (c. 1715 – 30 October 1770) was a British naval commander who fought in the Seven Years' War and conquered Manila on 6 October 1762.

Early career
Cornish joined the Navy in 1728, and having been promoted to lieutenant in 1739, he served at Cartagena in 1741. In 1742 he became flag captain of HMS Namur under Vice-Admiral Thomas Mathews and served with him in the Mediterranean. He was given command of HMS Guernsey later that year and commissioned HMS Stirling Castle in 1755. In 1758 he transferred to HMS Union.

He was elected a Fellow of the Royal Society in 1749.

Seven Years' War

In 1759 Samuel Cornish took part in some battles against the French. When Spain entered the war early in 1762 Cornish was appointed Commander of an East Indies Squadron, who, together with soldiers of the 79th Regiment under William Draper were ordered to attack the Spaniards in the Philippines.

In the following Battle of Manila the city was taken after a siege of 10 days. This victory made Cornish a very rich man.

He saw no further service after this battle. He became vice-admiral in October 1762, was MP for New Shoreham between 1765 and 1770 and was created a baronet in 1766, a title which became extinct upon his death.

In 1765 Cornish purchased Tofte Manor, Sharnbrook, in Bedfordshire.

He left his large fortune to his nephew Captain Samuel Pitchford, who at the head of HMS America, had also taken part in the capture of Manila.

Legacy
The town Cornish in New Hampshire was named after him.

A 1768 painting of Cornish, along with his fellow mariners Richard Kempenfelt and Thomas Parry went on permanent display at Queen's House in Greenwich in Autumn 2022. The painting is by the artist Tilly Kettle and was purchased by the National Maritime Museum, with assistance from the Society for Nautical Research.

References

External links
NY Times

|-

1710s births
1770 deaths
Royal Navy personnel of the Seven Years' War
Baronets in the Baronetage of Great Britain
Members of the Parliament of Great Britain for English constituencies
Royal Navy vice admirals
Year of birth uncertain
Fellows of the Royal Society
British MPs 1761–1768